Atchonsa is an arrondissement in the Ouémé department of Benin. It is an administrative division under the jurisdiction of the commune of Bonou. According to the population census conducted by the Institut National de la Statistique Benin on February 15, 2002, the arrondissement had a total population of 6007.

References

Populated places in the Ouémé Department
Arrondissements of Benin